Dhatuvardhani (pronounced Dhātuvardhani) is a ragam in Carnatic music (musical scale of South Indian classical music). Dhatuvardhani is the 69th Melakarta rāgam in the 72 melakarta rāgam system of Carnatic music. It is called Dhautapanchamam in Muthuswami Dikshitar school of Carnatic music.

Structure and Lakshana

Dhatuvardhani is the 3rd rāgam in the 12th chakra Aditya. The mnemonic name is Aditya-Go. The mnemonic phrase is sa ru gu mi pa dha nu. Dhatuvardhani's  structure (ascending and descending scale) is as follows (see swaras in Carnatic music for details on below notation and terms):
: 
: 
The notes used in this scale are shatsruthi rishabham, antara gandharam, prati madhyamam, shuddha dhaivatham and kakali nishadham.

As Dhatuvardhani is a melakarta rāgam, by definition it is a sampurna rāgam (it has all 7 notes in ascending and descending scale). It is the prati madhyamam equivalent of Gangeyabhushani, which is the 33rd melakarta.

Janya rāgams
A few minor janya rāgams (derived scales) are associated with Dhatuvardani. See List of Janya Rāgams for full list of rāgams associated with Dhatuvardhani and other 71 melakarta rāgams.

Compositions
A few common compositions set to Dhatuvardhani are:

Sukha kara by Koteeswara Iyer
Mahesham bhavayam by Dr. M. Balamuralikrishna

Related rāgams
This section covers the theoretical and scientific aspect of this rāgam.

Dhatuvardhani's notes when shifted using Graha bhedam, yields Gayakapriya, a minor melakarta rāgam. Graha bhedam is the step taken in keeping the relative note frequencies same, while shifting the shadjam to the next note in the rāgam. For further details and an illustration refer Graha bhedam on Gayakapriya.

Notes

References

Melakarta ragas